The Vicariate Apostolic of Inírida in the Catholic Church is located in the town of Inírida, Guainía in Colombia.

History
On 30 November 1996 Blessed John Paul II split the Vicariate Apostolic of Mitú-Puerto Inírida in two and created the Apostolic Vicariate of Mitú and the Vicariate Apostolic of Inírida.

Ordinaries
Antonio Bayter Abud, M.X.Y. (30 Nov 1996 – 3 Dec 2013)
Joselito Carreño Quiñonez, M.X.Y. (3 Dec 2013 - )

See also
Roman Catholicism in Colombia

Sources

Apostolic vicariates
Roman Catholic dioceses in Colombia
Christian organizations established in 1996
1996 establishments in Colombia